Aleksandr Grigoryevich Mazur (30 August 1913 – 16 December 2005) was a heavyweight Greco-Roman wrestler from Ukraine who won a world title in 1955, aged 42. He retired the same year and between 1955 and 1990 coached wrestlers at his sports society CSKA Moscow. His trainees included Aleksandr Yurkevich, Anatoly Kolesov, Yury Kozin, Anatoly Kirov, Georgy Vershinin, Vladimir Novokhatko and Valery Anisimov.

Mazur was born into a farmer's family and had two brothers and three sisters. He took up wrestling in 1934, and worked as a professional wrestler in a circus until the 1941 German invasion of Soviet Union, when he enlisted to the Soviet Army and until December 1942 fought as a sapper. After that he studied at the State University of Physical Education and won the Soviet heavyweight wrestling titles in 1944, 1945, 1947 and 1949, placing second in 1946, 1948 and 1950–1953 and third in 1943 and 1954. He later had minor roles in the Soviet films Wrestler and clown (1957) and Far from the war.

References

1913 births
2005 deaths
People from Lipovetsky Uyezd
Soviet male sport wrestlers
Ukrainian male sport wrestlers
Sportspeople from Vinnytsia Oblast
Soviet military personnel of World War II from Ukraine
Honoured Masters of Sport of the USSR